Ryan Lefebvre (born February 12, 1971) is an American sportscaster, best known as a play-by-play announcer for Major League Baseball's Kansas City Royals since 1999. In 2008, he became the primary announcer for Royals' television broadcasts on Bally Sports Kansas City. Lefebvre also provides play-by-play on the Royals Radio Network for some of the games that aren't covered on television, relieving longtime Royals announcer Denny Matthews.  Since the 2012 season, he has called most games on radio when Steve Physioc does the play-by-play on TV.

Lefebvre was named Most Valuable Player for the Minnesota Golden Gophers in 1993, and made first-team All Big Ten in 1991 and 1993 as an outfielder. In 1992, he played collegiate summer baseball with the Falmouth Commodores of the Cape Cod Baseball League and was named a league all-star. Lefebvre spent one season in the Cleveland Indians minor league system with the Watertown Indians of the New York–Penn League.

Lefebvre had also broadcast TV and cable for the Minnesota Twins from 1995 to 1998.

He is the son of former Major League Baseball player and manager Jim Lefebvre.

In early 2006, Lefebvre made public his struggle with depressive illness. Lefebvre also wrote a book detailing his experiences, titled The Shame of Me: One Man's Journey to Depression and Back.

Ryan Lefebvre has spoken about the importance of his Catholic faith in overcoming depression and gaining a renewed perspective on life.

References

1971 births
Living people
American Roman Catholics
American sports announcers
Falmouth Commodores players
Kansas City Royals announcers
Major League Baseball broadcasters
Minnesota Golden Gophers baseball players
Minnesota Twins announcers
Sportspeople from Los Angeles